Napier is a city on the eastern coast of the North Island of New Zealand and the seat of the Hawke's Bay region. It is a beachside city with a seaport, known for its sunny climate, esplanade lined with Norfolk Pines and extensive Art Deco architecture. Napier is sometimes referred to as the "Nice of the Pacific".

Napier is the nexus of the largest wool centre in the Southern Hemisphere, and it has the primary export seaport for northeastern New Zealand – which is the largest producer of apples, pears, and stone fruit in New Zealand. The Hawke's Bay wine region is now the second largest in New Zealand after Marlborough, and grapes grown around Hastings and Napier are sent through the Port of Napier for export. Large amounts of sheep's wool, frozen meat, wood pulp, and timber also pass through Napier annually for export. Smaller amounts of these materials are shipped via road and railway to the large metropolitan areas of New Zealand itself, such as Auckland, Wellington and Hamilton.

Napier is a popular tourist city, with a unique concentration of 1930s Art Deco, and to a lesser extent Spanish Mission, architecture, built after much of the city was razed in the 1931 Hawke's Bay earthquake. It also has one of the most photographed tourist attractions in the country, a statue of the figure in local Ngāti Kahungunu mythology, Pania, on Marine Parade, Pania of the Reef. Thousands of people flock to Napier every February for the Tremains Art Deco Weekend event, a celebration of its Art Deco heritage and history. Other notable tourist events attracting many outsiders to the region annually include F.A.W.C! Food and Wine Classic events, and the Mission Estate Concert at Mission Estate Winery in the suburb of Taradale.

History

Māori history
Napier has well-documented Māori history. When the Ngāti Kahungunu party of Taraia reached the district many centuries ago, the Whatumamoa, Rangitane, Ngāti Awa and elements of the Ngāti Tara iwi lived in the nearby areas of Petane, Te Whanganui-a-Orotu and Waiohiki. Ngāti Kahungunu later became the dominant force from Poverty Bay to Wellington. Chief Te Ahuriri cut a channel from the lagoon to the sea at Ahuriri because the Westshore entrance had become blocked, threatening cultivations surrounding the lagoon and the fishing villages on the islands in the lagoon. The rivers were continually feeding freshwater into the area. Ngāti Kahungunu were one of the first Māori tribes that European settlers had contact with.

European settlers history
Captain James Cook and his crew were the first Europeans to see the future site of Napier when they sailed down the east coast in October 1769. He commented: "On each side of this bluff head is a low, narrow sand or stone beach, between these beaches and the mainland is a pretty large lake of salt water I suppose." He said the harbour entrance was at the Westshore end of the shingle beach.

After 1830, the site was visited and later settled by European traders, whalers and missionaries. By the 1850s, farmers and hotel-keepers arrived.

The Crown purchased the Ahuriri block (including the site of Napier) in 1851. In 1854 Alfred Domett, a future Prime Minister of New Zealand, was appointed as the Commissioner of Crown Lands and the resident magistrate at the village of Ahuriri. It was decided to place a planned town here, its streets and avenues were laid out, and the new town named for Sir Charles Napier, a military leader during the "Battle of Meeanee" fought in the country of Sindh, in the Indian subcontinent. Domett named many streets in Napier to commemorate the colonial era of the British Indian Empire.

Development was generally confined to the hill and to the port area of Ahuriri. In the early years, Napier covered almost exclusively an oblong group of hills (the Scinde Island) which was nearly entirely surrounded by the ocean, but from which ran out two single spits, one to the north and one to the south. There was a swamp between the now Hastings Street and Wellesley Road and the sea extended to Clive Square.

Napier was designated as a borough in 1874, but the development of the surrounding marshlands and reclamation proceeded slowly. Between 1858 and 1876 Napier was the administrative centre for the Hawke's Bay Province, but in 1876 the "Abolition of Provinces Act", an act of the New Zealand Parliament, dissolved all provincial governments in New Zealand.

20th century
On 3 February 1931, most of Napier and nearby Hastings was levelled by an earthquake. The collapse of buildings and the ensuing fires killed 256 people. Some 4000 hectares of today's Napier were undersea before the earthquake raised it above sea level. The earthquake uplifted an area of 1500 km2 with a maximum of 2.7 m of uplift. In Hastings about 1 m of ground subsidence occurred.

The centre of Napier, destroyed by the earthquake, was rebuilt in the Art Deco style popular in the 1930s. Although a few Art Deco buildings were replaced with contemporary structures in the 1960s to 1980s, most of the centre remained intact for long enough to become recognised as architecturally important, and it has been protected and restored from the 1990s. Napier and the area of South Beach, Miami, Florida, are considered to be the two best-preserved Art Deco towns (with the town of Miami Beach, Florida, being mostly decorated in the somewhat later Streamline Moderne style of Art Deco). Beginning in 2007, Napier was nominated as a World Heritage Site with UNESCO. This is the first cultural site in New Zealand to be so nominated. It was denied World Heritage status in 2011 as it did not meet the appropriate criteria. Still, the report of the application acknowledged the Art Deco heritage as "first and foremost of outstanding value to all New Zealanders".

In January 1945, the  entered and departed from the port of Napier undetected. This event became the basis of a widely circulated postwar tall tale that the captain of this U-boat, Heinrich Timm, had led crewmen ashore near Napier to milk cows to supplement their meagre rations.

Modern history
Napier was the scene of an armed attack by cannabis dealer Jan Molenaar on three police officers searching his home in May 2009. He killed one officer, and wounded two others and a civilian. He continued to fire shots from his house, which police besieged until he committed suicide 40 hours later.

On 9 November 2020, a local state of emergency was declared in Napier after the region received 237 mm of rainfall across 24 hours – the most daily rainfall in the city since 1963 and the second most since records began. The event caused widespread flooding, slips, power cuts and evacuations.

On 14 February 2023, floods caused by Cyclone Gabrielle destroyed bridges over the Tutaekuri River, and damaged a major regional electrical substation at Redclyffe, which cut power to much of northern Hawke's Bay including its telecommunication infrastructure. Flooding also caused extensive property damage to Esk Valley, Taradale and Meeanee, as well as loss of crops, livestock and several human lives.

Geography and climate

The city is on Napier Hill and the surrounding Heretaunga Plains at the southeastern edge of Hawke Bay, a large semi-circular bay that dominates the east coast of New Zealand's North Island. The coastline of the city was substantially altered by a large earthquake in 1931. The topography puts Napier in danger from a tsunami, as the centre of the commercial city is near sea level – should the sea ever crest Marine Parade the sea would run through to Ahuriri. Furthermore, by virtue of its pre 1931 existence, the bulk of Napier is susceptible to soil liquefaction, the risk classed as Very High for the main urban area excluding the hill.

Under the Köppen climate classification, Napier has an oceanic climate (Cfb). The climate is warm and relatively dry resulting from its location on the east coast of the North Island. Most of New Zealand's weather patterns cross the country from the west, and the city lies in the rain shadow of the North Island Volcanic Plateau and surrounding ranges such as the Kaweka Range.

Suburbs

Suburbs of Napier include:

Ahuriri Ward:
Ahuriri
Bay View
Napier Port
Bluff Hill
Hospital Hill
Onekawa (north part)
Pandora
Westshore

Nelson Park Ward:
Awatoto (north part)
Maraenui
Marewa (south part)
Napier CBD
Napier South
Onekawa (south part)
Pirimai (south part)

Onekawa-Tamatea Ward:
Marewa (north part)
Onekawa (rest)
Onekawa Central
Onekawa West
Pirimai (north part)
Tamatea
Tamatea North
Tamatea South

Taradale Ward:
Awatoto (south part)
Greenmeadows
Jervoistown
Lagoon Farm
Meeanee
Orutu Park
Poraiti
Taradale
Taradale North
Taradale South
Te Awa

Demographics

Napier City had a population of 62,241 at the 2018 New Zealand census, an increase of 5,001 people (8.7%) since the 2013 census, and an increase of 6,882 people (12.4%) since the 2006 census. There were 23,670 households, comprising 29,766 males and 32,478 females, giving a sex ratio of 0.92 males per female. The median age was 42.0 years (compared with 37.4 years nationally), with 12,321 people (19.8%) aged under 15 years, 10,740 (17.3%) aged 15 to 29, 26,712 (42.9%) aged 30 to 64, and 12,465 (20.0%) aged 65 or older.

Ethnicities were 81.2% European/Pākehā, 22.2% Māori, 3.4% Pacific peoples, 5.0% Asian, and 1.9% other ethnicities. People may identify with more than one ethnicity.

The percentage of people born overseas was 16.3, compared with 27.1% nationally.

Although some people chose not to answer the census's question about religious affiliation, 52.3% had no religion, 34.3% were Christian, 2.6% had Māori religious beliefs, 0.6% were Hindu, 0.3% were Muslim, 0.7% were Buddhist and 2.0% had other religions.

Of those at least 15 years old, 8,622 (17.3%) people had a bachelor's or higher degree, and 10,116 (20.3%) people had no formal qualifications. The median income was $28,900, compared with $31,800 nationally. 6,660 people (13.3%) earned over $70,000 compared to 17.2% nationally. The employment status of those at least 15 was that 23,535 (47.1%) people were employed full-time, 7,422 (14.9%) were part-time, and 1,755 (3.5%) were unemployed.

Tourism and architecture

Napier's major tourist attraction is its architecture, which draws Art Deco and architecture enthusiasts from around the world. The rebuilding period after the 1931 earthquake coincided with the short-lived and rapidly changing Art Deco era and the Great Depression, when little "mainstreet" development was being undertaken elsewhere. As a result, Napier's architecture is strikingly different from any other city; the other notable Art Deco city, Miami Beach, has Streamline Moderne Art Deco. The whole centre of Napier was rebuilt simultaneously.

Other tourist attractions in Napier include MTG Hawke's Bay (the museum, art gallery and theatre) which features information on both the 1931 earthquake and Napier's redesign as an Art Deco city, the National Aquarium, the Napier Prison, the Soundshell and the Pania of the Reef statue. The Pania statue on Marine Parade is regarded in Napier in much the same way that the Little Mermaid statue is regarded in Copenhagen. In October 2005 the statue was stolen, but it was recovered a week later, largely unharmed. Marineland was a tourist attraction from 1965 until it closed in 2009.

The National Aquarium is one of the foremost aquariums in New Zealand. The historic Napier Prison is the oldest prison in New Zealand and visitors can learn about the history of prisons as well as witness the path of the 1931 earthquake. It is the only place in Napier where some of the earthquake damage has been left in place. Tourists flock to Napier in February for Art Deco weekend. In 2018, the festival celebrated its 30th year, attracting an estimated 45,000 people. The Mission Estate Winery Concert in the Napier suburb of Greenmeadows which has featured Chris De Burgh, Olivia Newton-John, Eric Clapton, Kenny Rogers, Ray Charles, Rod Stewart, Sting performing with the NZ Symphony Orchestra, Shirley Bassey, Beach Boys, Doobie Brothers, Tom Jones, and in 2013 Barry Gibb with Carol King.

Attractions nearby include the Cape Kidnappers Gannet Colony and many vineyards bordering Taradale, Hastings City, and north of Napier around Bay View and the Esk Valley.

Many people use Napier as a gateway to Hawke's Bay, flying in to Hawke's Bay Airport at Westshore from Wellington City, Auckland and Christchurch. Tourists also enter Napier by State Highway 2 along the coast and State Highway 5 from Taupo. The rail line in and out of Hawke's Bay has not had a passenger service since 2001.

Culture and entertainment

Napier markets itself as the Art Deco Capital. The Hawke's Bay wine region is important to Napier's economy, with over 70 wineries located in the area. The region featured in Wine Enthusiast Magazine as one of the 10 Best Wine Travel Destinations in 2015. The region is New Zealand's largest apple, pear and stone fruit producer. The Port of Napier and rail network provides quick export of these goods.

A large attraction is the Art Deco building designs. Marine Parade is one of Napier's most famous highlights – a tree-lined ocean boulevard with fountains, gardens, mini golf, statues and spas. The National Aquarium of New Zealand is at the south end of Marine Parade. The historic Napier Prison is located off the northern end of Marine Parade. Recent redevelopments of Marine Parade have seen the addition of shaded picnic areas and playgrounds. Napier's theatre scene includes productions put on by the Napier Operatic Society, based at the Tabard Theatre and putting on musicals at the Napier Municipal Theatre, another notable example of Art Deco architecture. There are high street and boutique stores as well as antique shops, art galleries, and studios of potters, wood turners and craftsman.

The marina and waterfront in Ahuriri is a sea-tourism attraction. Swimming and family activities are popular in Pandora Pond – a salt water inlet by the inner harbour in Ahuriri – or on the beaches and playgrounds of Marine Parade, Westshore and Ahuriri. The several rivers that flow through the region are used for water activities, such as jet boating, jet skiing, rowing, kayaking, fishing, whitebaiting and swimming.

Development of the region's cycleways and walkways has included dedicated cycle lanes being established on urban streets in the Napier-Hastings urban areas, as well as a large variety of off-road pathways, which are often used as mixed use pathways for cyclists and pedestrians, such as the paths that stretch from Bay View to Clifton. The Hawke's Bay Trails contain nearly 200 km of cycleways that meander through and around the cities, and link the Napier-Hastings urban areas with surrounding suburbs and the local district.

McLean Park is the main sporting venue in Hawke's Bay. The main sports played at the venue are cricket and rugby union. It was used to host matches during the 1987 Rugby World Cup, the 2011 Rugby World Cup and the 2015 Cricket World Cup.

The annual model aircraft show 'Warbirds over Awatoto' takes place on the outskirts of Napier. The 2013 gathering attracted 48 pilots and 120 planes.

Economy
The largest industry in Napier and its environs is processing/manufacturing, the major products being food, textiles, wood, metal products and machinery/equipment. Other significant industries for the region include property/business services, rural production/rural services and retail.

Napier was once home to one of New Zealand's largest smoking tobacco plants. On 9 September 2005 British American Tobacco announced it would close the Rothmans factory, due to diminished demand. Production has moved to Australia. The Art Deco-style factory had been producing up to 2.2 billion cigarettes a year for the New Zealand and Pacific Island markets. In March 1999, 19 people lost their jobs there because "fewer people are smoking".

Government

Local

Napier has been governed by Napier City Council since 1950.

Local government reform was mooted in the late 1990s and a referendum was held in 1999 proposing an amalgamation of the Hastings District Council with the Napier City Council. Although supported by approximately two-thirds of Hastings voters, Napier voters rejected the proposal by a similar number and the proposal was defeated.

The National Government amended the Local Government Act in 2012 to determine a reorganisation proposal by a majority vote over the entire proposed area, rather than a majority over each existing area as was previously the case. Yet another change was to allow private submissions to the commission to trigger the process, whereas previously only local councils themselves could request a change in structure or boundary. The legislative restrictions on councils using public funds to support or challenge a final proposal did not apply to private lobby groups or individuals however.

After a lengthy and divisive regional campaign to restructure local government in Hawke's Bay, in 2015 the Local Government Commission put forward a final reorganisation proposal to amalgamate Napier City Council with Wairoa District Council, Hastings District Council and Central Hawke's Bay District Council to form a proposed 'Hawke's Bay Council'. A postal ballot was established to maximise voter returns, and the vote closed on 15 September 2015. An interim count was available later that day, that saw the proposal defeated across the region by about 66%. In Napier the proposal was rejected by 84% of voters.

National

The city is part of the  general electorate and the  Māori electorate. After the 2020 general election, Napier is held by Stuart Nash while Ikaroa-Rāwhiti is held by Meka Whaitiri, both of the governing Labour Party.

Sport

The city is home to the professional basketball team Hawke's Bay Hawks, which plays in the National Basketball League. It plays its home games in the Pettigrew Green Arena.

Transportation

Air
Hawke's Bay Airport is the main airport in the Hawke's Bay region and has domestic flight services. It is jointly owned by the government, Napier City Council, and Hastings District Council, and is operated by Hawke's Bay Airport Ltd. The airport is located in the Napier suburb of Westshore. Air New Zealand provides frequent direct flights to and from Auckland, Wellington and Christchurch. Originair serves Hamilton, Palmerston North and Nelson. Jetstar, a Qantas subsidiary, used to serve Auckland from 2015 to 2019. Sounds Air previously used to operate direct flights to Blenheim daily and smaller charter companies also operate including Air Napier to Gisborne. The airport was historically referred to as Napier Airport and its IATA code reflects that: NPE. It is situated on land that was formerly the Ahuriri Lagoon, an area that was raised above sea level by the massive 1931 Napier earthquake.

The airport is located approximately 22 km north of Hastings Aerodrome, a smaller airport located close to Hastings that caters mainly for flight training and general aviation.

Pathways

The Hawke's Bay region has extensive cycleways and footpaths that originally began as the 'Rotary Pathways' between Napier and Hastings, and is now known as the 'Hawke's Bay Trails'. The network of pathways link the urban areas of Napier and Hastings, as well as many of the other outlying suburbs of the two cities. Some of the cycleways include dedicated cycling lanes on roads within the city, as well as separate dedicated pathways on roadsides and through parks and other areas, many of which are mixed use pathways for cyclists and pedestrians, such as the paths that stretch from Bay View to Clifton. The Hawke's Bay Trails contain over 200 km of cycleways that meander through and around the Napier-Hastings twin cities. The Napier Rotary Pathway creates a loop that encompasses the city from Esk River, to Westshore, Napier Central, Awatoto, Taradale, Poraiti, and looping back to the Esk Valley. This rotary also has several links to the Hastings Rotary Pathway.

Roads
State Highway 2 is the principal state highway serving Napier, connecting it to Wairoa and Gisborne to the north, and, via Dannevirke, to Wellington, Masterton and Palmerston North to the south.  Between Napier and Hastings, SH 2 follows the Hawke's Bay Expressway, also known as the Napier-Hastings Expressway, which provides a direct and efficient link between the two cities.  Although the Hawke's Bay Expressway bypasses Napier itself, it has connections to many of Napier's arterial roads that lead to the city centre and the Port (such as the junctions at Kennedy Road, Taradale Road, Prebensen Drive and Meeanee Quay) and also intersects with the access road to Hawke's Bay Airport.

State Highway 5, known as the Napier-Taupo Road, begins at a junction on SH 2 just north of the Napier suburb of Bay View, and connects Napier and the Hawke's Bay region to Taupo and the central North Island. It is also the main route used for traffic travelling from Napier-Hastings to Auckland, Hamilton, Rotorua and Tauranga, as it is quicker than the route through Gisborne taken by SH 2.

State Highway 50 connects Napier to the southwestern Hawke's Bay, going through many small settlements. It also connects Napier to many of Hawke's Bay's wineries, of which the region is well known for. It makes up part of the Hawke's Bay Wine Trail.

State Highway 51 is an alternative connection between Napier and Hastings, and largely follows the original route of SH 2 between the two cities prior to the completion of the Hawke's Bay Expressway, and SH 2 being shifted to run along it.  While the original route followed Meeanee Quay through the suburbs of Westshore and Ahuriri before bridging across the Pandora Pond area of the Napier Inner Harbour marina, the SH 51 route follows Taradale Road instead, meeting up with the original SH 2 route at the southern base of Napier Hill at Hyderabad Road.  The route then moves onto Georges Drive, where it borders the southern and western edges of the Napier city centre. It meets up with Marine Parade south of the CBD, and then follows the coast south from Napier through Clive to Hastings.

Buses
Go Bus operates 9 Go Bay routes in Napier, with funding from Regional Council. Bee Cards replaced goBay cards in August 2020.

Rail
The Palmerston North–Gisborne Line runs through Napier. The southern portion of the line between Napier and Palmerston North was built between 1872 and 1891, and the northern portion between Napier and Gisborne from 1912 to 1942. The line from Gisborne enters Napier via the coast, making its way through the city, before eventually turning inland towards Hastings, and onwards to Woodville (where the Wairarapa Line branches off) and Palmerston North.

The Napier Port Branch, formerly known as the Ahuriri Branch, is a 2 km railway branch line off the Palmerston North-Gisborne Line that serves the Port of Napier. Napier Railway Station was the main railway station in Napier and an intermediate stop on the Palmerston North-Gisborne Line. It opened on 12 October 1874, when the station and the first section of the line between Napier and Hastings was opened. The line through the Manawatu Gorge to Palmerston North and hence to Wellington was opened on 9 March 1891. The line north of Napier to Gisborne was opened on 3 August 1942, with passenger services from 7 September. Napier was the terminus for both Gisborne and Wellington goods trains, though some passenger trains ran straight through.

The original Napier station building was on the corner of Station Street and Millar Street, close to the centre of Napier. The facilities on the site increased to include the passenger station plus a goods yard, locomotive depot, workshop and a way and works branch. The line was on a curve and difficult to work, and the site was limited by level crossings at each end and with no room for expansion.

Hence in a two-year programme to 1991 most functions followed the Way and Works to Pandora Point, at the start of the Ahuriri Branch, leaving only a new InterCity coach and train terminal on the city site, fronting Munroe Street. The old station was closed on 6 October 1990, and was replaced by a new station on 9 June 1991. The existing station and three-story administrative block built in the late 1950s and early 1960s were demolished and some three hectares of land was available for retail development.

A marshalling yard, freight terminal, locomotive depot and other facilities were established at Pandora Point, with a triangle provided to turn trains and giving direct access north and south from the port branch. The Ahuriri yard was closed. The old main line north to Gisborne was realigned to the east to allow a new link road to the Tamatea area of Napier, and railways land was redeveloped as an industrial subdivision. On 7 October 2001 the Bay Express from Wellington to Napier was cancelled and passenger services on the line ceased.

Infrastructure and services

Health 
Napier Hospital opened on what is now Hospital Hill in 1880. During the 1990s, hospital services in the Hawke's Bay were rationalised, culminating in  Napier Hospital closing in 1998 and most services transferred to Hastings Hospital (now Hawke's Bay Fallen Soldiers' Memorial Hospital). 

In addition to the services provided by Hawke's Bay Hospital, the Hawke's Bay District Health Board operates a 24-hour urgent care and outpatient clinic located in central Napier.

Energy
Town gas supply to Napier began in January 1876 following the completion of the Napier gas works on the corner of Wellesley Road and Sale Street. The Napier Borough Council established its first gas street lights in 1879.

The Napier Municipal Electricity Department (MED) established the city's first public supply in September 1913, using town gas and later diesel engines for generation and supplied consumers with 230/460 volts DC. Street lighting switched to electricity in 1915. Conversion to the now-standard 230/400 volts AC began in 1925 with the commissioning of a 400 kW Fullager diesel generator, ahead of the arrival of grid power from Mangahao in 1927 and from Waikaremoana in 1929. The Fullager generator remained in service as a peaking plant until it was decommissioned in 1970. Taradale and rural areas around the city were supplied by the Hawke's Bay Electric Power Board, formed in 1924. 

Natural gas arrived in Napier and Hastings in 1983, with the completion of the high-pressure pipeline from Kapuni gas field in Taranaki via Palmerston North to the cities. Town gas consumers were converted to natural gas over the next five years, culminating in the Napier gas works closing on 21 March 1988.

In 1991, the MED merged with the Electric Power Board, later renamed Hawke's Bay Power. The 1998 electricity sector reforms saw the retail base sold to Contact Energy, with the remaining lines business renamed Hawke's Bay Networks and later Unison Networks.

In February 2004, the city and wider Hawke's Bay region lost natural gas supply for six days after a flood washed away a bridge near Ashhurst supporting the high-pressure pipeline to the region.

Water supply and sanitation 
Napier's reticulated water supply is drawn from the Heretaunga Plains artesian aquifer below the city through seven bores.

The city's wastewater plant is at Awatoto, and treated wastewater is discharged into Hawke Bay via a  outfall pipe. The Awatoto wastewater plant and outfall were opened in 1973, replacing the previous outfall at Perfume Point in Ahuriri. The wastewater plant was initially a communitor station and was upgraded in 1991 with milliscreens and in 2014 with biological trickling filters.

Schools and higher education

Napier has five state secondary schools: Napier Boys' High School, Napier Girls' High School, William Colenso College, Tamatea High School and Taradale High School. Other secondary schools include Sacred Heart College and St Joseph's Māori Girls' College, both state integrated Catholic girls' schools, and Te Kura Kaupapa Māori o Te Ara Hou, a Māori language immersion school.

The Eastern Institute of Technology in Taradale is the main tertiary education provider for Napier and the Hawke's Bay.

Media 
The Hastings-based Hawke's Bay Today is the main daily newspaper serving Napier. The newspaper was established in 1999 following the merger of the Napier-based The Daily Telegraph with the Hastings-based Hawke's Bay Herald-Tribune.

Television arrived in the city in 1962 with the commissioning of a private translator relaying Wellington's WNTV1 (now part of TVNZ 1). Official coverage came in 1966 with the commissioning the Mount Erin transmitter.

Notable people
Sir Ian Axford – space scientist
Mike Boon – comedian
Adele Broadbent (born 1968), children's author
Sir Ashley Bloomfield – Chief Executive of the Ministry of Health and the country's Director-General of Health, born in Napier
Frank Livingstone Combs – Teacher and author, born in Napier
Thomas Allan Napier Corson – businessman and local politician, born in Napier
Archibald George William Dunningham – one of founders of modern librarianship in New Zealand
Spencer Gollan – sportsman and racehorse owner
Debbie Harwood – singer with When The Cat's Away
Paul Henare – basketball player for the New Zealand Breakers and the Tall Blacks
Alfred Hindmarsh – politician
Chris Jackson – former New Zealand international and Napier City Rovers association football player
Anna Kavan, British novelist, lived in Napier in 1942–43
Phil Lamason – WWII pilot – born in Napier
Simon Mannering – New Zealand Warriors rugby league player and captain
Paratene Matchitt – artist
Stuart Nash – politician
Dean Parker – writer and political commentator (born in Napier)
Nyree Dawn Porter – actress
John Psathas – composer
Major General Sir Andrew Hamilton Russell KCB, KCMG – born in Napier
Darren Smith – field hockey player
Anna Elizabeth Jerome Spencer- Educator 
Percy Storkey – soldier and Victoria Cross winner
Chris Tremain – politician
Kel Tremain – rugby player
Shane Young – Mixed Martial Arts fighter
Jamie Curry – YouTube Personality

Sister cities
Napier City Council recognises three sister city relationships:

Lianyungang, Jiangsu, China
Tomakomai, Japan
Victoria, British Columbia, Canada

References

External links

City of Napier official website

 
Art Deco
Port cities in New Zealand
Populated places in the Hawke's Bay Region
Former provincial capitals of New Zealand
Art Deco architecture in New Zealand
Populated places established in 1854
1854 establishments in New Zealand